Auri may refer to:

 Auri, Latvia, a village in the historical region of Semigallia
 Auri, Uttar Pradesh, a village in Uttar Pradesh, India
 Auri (band), a Finnish band formed in 2017
 Auri (album), 2018
 Acacia auriculiformis, a tree species
 Lablab purpureus, a bean species also known as Indian bean
 Indonesian Air Force, formerly AURI, currently TNI–AU
 Auri (footballer) (born 1973), Auri Dias Faustino, Brazilian footballer
 Auri, a character from The Kingkiller Chronicle series of books

See also
 Auris (disambiguation)